The Municipality of Puconci is a municipality in the traditional region of Prekmurje in northeastern Slovenia. The seat of the municipality is the town of Puconci. Puconci became a municipality in 1994.

The majority of the population is Lutheran, making Puconci one of the few Slovenian municipalities where the majority of the population belongs to a non-Catholic denomination.

Settlements
In addition to the municipal seat of Puconci, the municipality also includes the following settlements:

 Beznovci
 Bodonci
 Bokrači
 Brezovci
 Dankovci
 Dolina
 Gorica
 Kuštanovci
 Lemerje
 Mačkovci
 Moščanci
 Otovci
 Pečarovci
 Poznanovci
 Predanovci
 Prosečka Vas
 Puževci
 Šalamenci
 Strukovci
 Vadarci
 Vaneča
 Zenkovci

References

External links

Municipality of Puconci on Geopedia
Puconci municipal site

Puconci
1994 establishments in Slovenia